This is a list of Nigerian films released in 2003.

Films

See also
List of Nigerian films

References

External links
2003 films at the Internet Movie Database

2003
Lists of 2003 films by country or language
Films